Funny Creek is a stream in the U.S. state of Mississippi. It is a tributary to the Skuna River.

Funny in this context is a name derived from the Choctaw language meaning "squirrel".

References

Rivers of Mississippi
Rivers of Pontotoc County, Mississippi
Mississippi placenames of Native American origin